Apura xylodryas is a species of moth of the family Tortricidae. It is found on Samoa.

References

Moths described in 1927
Polyorthini
Moths of Oceania